Mascarose I of Armagnac (died 1246), was a Countess regnant suo jure of Armagnac and Fézensac in 1245-1246.

References

 « Fezenzac », dans Louis Charles Dezobry et Théodore Bachelet, Dictionnaire de Biographie et d’Histoire, vol. 1, Paris, 1863

13th-century women rulers
1246 deaths
Counts of Fézensac
Counts of Armagnac
Year of birth unknown